James Moore (August 30, 1890 – October 28, 1971) was an American fencer. He competed in the individual épée event at the 1912 Summer Olympics.  He graduated from Harvard University and Harvard Law School.

References

External links
 

1890 births
1971 deaths
American male épée fencers
Olympic fencers of the United States
Fencers at the 1912 Summer Olympics
Sportspeople from Detroit
Harvard Crimson fencers
Harvard Law School alumni